Sea Island Centre is an at-grade station on the Canada Line of Metro Vancouver's SkyTrain rapid transit system. The station is located on Sea Island in Richmond, British Columbia.

The Vancouver International Airport Authority contributed up to $300 million toward the airport branch of the Canada Line, which includes Sea Island Centre. This station, along with Templeton, was built at-grade to allow for the future construction of an elevated aircraft taxiway over the Canada Line guideway.

Services
Sea Island Centre station serves Vancouver International Airport (YVR), and airline-related industrial area along Grant McConachie Way, east of the airport. During off hours, the station is served by the N10 bus route, which provides service to Downtown Vancouver and Richmond–Brighouse station.

Station information

Station layout

Entrances
Sea Island Centre is served by two entrances. The northern entrance is located adjacent to the North Service Road, it provides access to an Air Canada hangar as well as other airport-related businesses. Parking lots for airport employees is also located at this entrance.  The southern entrance is located on Miller Road.

Airport surcharge
As with all stations on Sea Island—YVR–Airport, Sea Island Centre, and Templeton—a $5.00 surcharge, the "YVR AddFare", applies to fares paid with cash, with Compass Card stored value, or with DayPasses purchased at the station for eastbound trips originating from this station to Bridgeport station or beyond. Trips using a monthly pass are exempt, as are trips using DayPasses purchased and activated off Sea Island. Trips to Sea Island Centre are not subject to the surcharge. Travel between YVR–Airport, Sea Island Centre, and Templeton stations is free.

Image gallery

References

External links
 

Buildings and structures in Richmond, British Columbia
Canada Line stations
Railway stations in Canada opened in 2009
2009 establishments in British Columbia
Vancouver International Airport
Sea Island (British Columbia)